The South African Railways Class 16E 4-6-2 of 1935 was a steam locomotive.

In 1935, the South African Railways placed six Class 16E steam locomotives with a  Pacific type wheel arrangement in express passenger train service.

Manufacturer
Following the Great Depression in South Africa of 1930-1933, the South African Railways (SAR) set out to improve its Cape Town-Johannesburg express passenger service. To attain higher average speeds for its more important express trains, the Class 16E 4-6-2 Pacific type locomotive was designed by A.G. Watson, Chief Mechanical Engineer of the SAR from 1929 to 1936, specifically for use with the Union Express and the Union Limited trains. Six locomotives were built by Henschel and Son in Kassel, Germany and delivered in 1935, numbered in the range from 854 to 859.

Characteristics
With its  diameter coupled wheels, the Class 16E was considered the most remarkable Cape gauge express passenger locomotive ever built. It had the largest fire grate on any Pacific outside North America. The coupled wheels were the largest ever used on any less than  standard gauge locomotive and it had an all-up weight and tractive effort equal to or exceeding that of most Pacifics outside North America.

Watson experienced considerable difficulty to keep the axle loads within the permissible limits specified by the Chief Civil Engineer, with the result that the ashpan, cab, side running boards and several other parts were made of thinner material than usual. Even the original number plates were cast in aluminium.

The main bar frames were machined from rolled steel slabs and each frame was in one piece from the front to the hind buffer beam. The wheels were fitted with hollow crank pins, while the leading bogie was fitted with an oil bath centre pivot. The connecting and coupling rods were fitted with floating bronze bushes and were made of special chrome-nickel alloy steel of fluted section. The centre driving set of coupled wheels were flangeless and had wider treads than the other two sets to prevent them from slipping off the rails in sharp curves.

To obtain increased tractive effort with the large coupled wheels, larger cylinders of  bore by  stroke were used. Each cylinder was cast integral with half of the smokebox saddle, which made the castings interchangeable.

Given the successful operation of rotary cam poppet valve gear on the Class 19C, it was also used on the Class 16E. The valves were driven by outside rotary propshafts from turning mechanisms mounted on the driving coupled wheels. The valves were double-seated and housed at each end of the cylinders, an arrangement that resulted in short and straight ports between the valves and the cylinder barrels. Most of the detail parts of the rotary cam gear, particularly the main drive and reversing gear, were interchangeable with similar parts on the Class 19C. The poppet valve gear gave the engine extremely free-running characteristics.

The Class 16E was delivered with a Watson Standard no. 3A boiler, one of the range of standard boiler types designed by Watson as part of his standardisation policy. The boiler and the firebox were entirely clothed with Alfol insulation.

Because of this and the limitations of the loading gauge, the boiler was domeless with an inspection manhole on top of the boiler barrel where the dome would have been. Steam was collected through numerous small feeder pipes fixed into two collector pipes which were arranged as high as possible above the water surface. The collector pipes then joined together to form a main steam pipe,  in diameter, which led to the superheater header and multiple valve regulator located in the smokebox. The boiler was fitted with two large Pop safety valves mounted ahead of the firebox, one on either side of the boiler and angled about 80 degrees apart.

The firebox had a power-operated Ajax fire-door and the grate was of the sectional pin-hole type, fitted with power-operated shaking gear. To assist in keeping within the axle load limits, the ashpan was constructed of relatively thin anti-corrosive steel plates of a special heat-resisting quality. The brick arch was supported by five  diameter arch tubes. The firebox was fitted with SAR standard type flexible stays and to allow easier access to the stays, the engine was equipped with a Watson cab with its slanted front which, like the Watson Standard boiler, was to become the standard on later SAR steam locomotive classes. The cab was of special light steel and was welded throughout.

Service
The Class 16E Pacifics were placed in service at Kimberley and regularly worked trains like the Union Express and Union Limited southward to Beaufort West and northward to Johannesburg respectively. The Union train was to become the Blue Train after the Second World War. Although the locomotives were never stationed at Braamfontein Loco in Johannesburg, they were serviced there in the process of working between Kimberley and Johannesburg.

They proved to be very successful, efficient and economical in service when handling loads within their capacity.

From here, they hauled regular passenger trains, including the Orange Express, working north to Johannesburg and south to De Aar as well as across to Kimberley. When air-conditioned lounge cars were added to trains like the Orange Express and Trans-Karoo, they were again considered not powerful enough for the additional load and were eventually withdrawn from service in 1972.

Preservation

When Watson retired in 1936, no. 858 was officially named after him. It carried the name Allan G Watson above its number plates on the cab sides. By the time the Class 16E was withdrawn from service, this engine bore the name Betty below the headlight.

Two locomotives survive and were still relatively intact by 2015. No. 858 Betty was stored in the open at Beaconsfield in Kimberley while no. 857 Ann Smith • Bloemfontein Queen was in storage at Bloemfontein, parked under cover at the locomotive depot.

Commemoration
A 20c postage stamp depicting a Class 16E locomotive was one of a set of four commemorative postage stamps issued by the South African Post Office on 27 April 1983 to commemorate the steam locomotives of South Africa that were rapidly being withdrawn from service at the time. The artwork and stamp design was by the noted stamp designer and artist Hein Botha. The locomotive depicted was Class 16E no. 858. The outline of a traditional SAR locomotive number plate was used as a commemorative cancellation for De Aar on the date of issue.

Illustration
Class 16E locomotives were equipped with smoke deflectors in later years.

References

1950
1950
1950
4-6-2 locomotives
2′C1′ h2 locomotives
Henschel locomotives
Cape gauge railway locomotives
Railway locomotives introduced in 1935
1935 in South Africa